Woodbine may refer to:

Species of Lonicera (honeysuckle), particularly:
 Lonicera periclymenum, European honeysuckle
 Lonicera xylosteum, fly honeysuckle

Species of Parthenocissus, particularly:
 Parthenocissus quinquefolia, Virginia creeper
 Parthenocissus tricuspidata, Japanese creeper
 Parthenocissus vitacea, thicket creeper, false Virginia creeper

Unrelated species:
 Clematis virginiana, devil's darning needles
 Gelsemium sempervirens, yellow jessamine